The Meru or Amîîrú (including the Ngaa) are a Bantu ethnic group that inhabit the Meru region of Kenya. The region is situated on the fertile lands of the north and eastern slopes of Mount Kenya in the former Eastern Province.

The word Meru means 'shining light' in the Meru language. In Kiswahili, the Meru are called Ng'aa, a word meaning 'Dazzling Shine' in both that language and Meru. Ameru in the Meru language means 'the shining ones' or 'the children of the shining one'. The word Miiru was also used to refer to the nearby forests of Mount Kenya, thus the name Amiiru, meaning 'people of the forest'. The Ameru people comprise nine subgroups: the Igoji, Imenti, Tigania, Mitine, Igembe, Mwimbi, Muthambi, Chuka and Tharaka. The Tharaka live in the semi-arid part of Greater Meru and they, along with the Mwimbi, Muthambi and Chuka, form the Tharaka-Nithi County. The Ameru are unrelated to the Wameru of northern Tanzania, other than both being avid farming Bantu communities.

Languages
The Meru speak the Meru language, also known as Kimîîrú. Meru, Kikamba, Kiembu, Kimbeere and Kikuyu share critical language characteristics. The Meru language is not uniform across the Meru lands, but comprises several mutually intelligible dialects which vary geographically. Each dialect is a reflection of previous migratory patterns, the level of intra-community interactions, and the influences of other adjacent Bantu, Nilotic and Cushitic communities. As a whole language scholars have demonstrated that the Meru language exhibits much older Bantu characteristics in grammar and phonetic forms than neighbouring Bantu languages.

History

The Meru people are of Bantu origin. Like the closely related Kikuyu, Embu and Mbeere, they are concentrated in the vicinity of Mount Kenya. The exact place that the ancestors of the Meru migrated from after the initial Bantu expansion from West Africa is uncertain. Some authorities suggest that they arrived in their present Mount Kenya homeland from earlier settlements to the north and east, while others argue that the Meru, along with their closely related Eastern Bantu neighbors moved into what is now Kenya from points further south.

The name "Meru" refers to both the people and the region, which for many years was the only administrative unit. In 1992, "Greater" Meru District was divided into three administrative units: Meru Central, Meru North, and Tharaka-Nithi (Tharaka and Meru South). After the promulgation of a new constitution in Kenya on 27 August 2010, Greater Meru was further re-defined and now consists of the twin counties of Tharaka-Nithi and Meru.

Council of elders

The Ameru have been governed by elected and hierarchical councils of elders since the 17th century. These extend from the clan level up to the supreme Njuri Ncheke council. Membership of the Njuri Ncheke is the highest social rank to which a Meru man can aspire. The elders forming the Njuri Ncheke are carefully selected and comprise mature, composed, respected and incorruptible members of the community. This is necessary as their work requires great wisdom, personal discipline, and knowledge of the traditions. The Njuri Ncheke is also the apex of the traditional Meru judicial system and their edicts apply to the entire community.

The functions of the Njuri Ncheke are to make and execute community laws, to hear and settle disputes, and to pass on community knowledge and norms across generations in their role as the custodians of traditional culture. Local disputes will invariably first be dealt with by lower ranks of the elders (Kiama), then the middle rank (Njuri) and finally the Njuri Ncheke. However, the Njuri Ncheke does not handle matters involving non-Meru people, or those that are expressly designated as being under Kenya's common law. The determination of cases by the Njuri Ncheke, just like is for common law, relies a lot on case law and precedence.

A lesser known, yet important function of the Njuri Ncheke, is overseeing and enforcing the rules and regulations controlling the use and conservation of open grasslands, salt-licks and forests.  Their work as conservators extends to the preservation of the Sacred Sites.

The Njuri Ncheke is influential in socio-economic and political decision-making amongst the Meru. The council spearheaded the establishment of the Meru College of Science and Technology and donated 641 acres of community land in 1983 for its development. In 2008, the college was upgraded to a University College of Jomo Kenyatta University of Agriculture and Technology. In early 2013, the college was awarded a charter by President Mwai Kibaki and renamed to Meru University of Science and Technology. The Njuri Ncheke is represented in the University Council.

Culture and family traditions

The Meru are primarily agrarian, and their home life and culture is similar to other Highland Bantus. The Meru have maintained adherence to a fairly strict customary code amongst the various cohorts of the population. For instance, circumcision is a mandatory rite of passage for boys, during which time cultural education including community norms and expectations, such as respect for elders and protection of children are taught in a seclusion period that may last up to a month. As a matter of principle, young men must ensure minimal contact with their mothers after initiation. Nowadays, the depth of instruction varies depending on the extent of urban influence. Previously, girls would also undergo circumcision, but the practice was outlawed by the Njuri Ncheke in April 1956. The practice has been progressively abandoned and is being replaced by instruction based alternative rites of passage.

Cuisine

Education

The Meru have a strong modern educational heritage provided by Christian missionaries. The main education institutions were started or sponsored by the Catholic, Methodist and Presbyterian churches. Greater Meru has numerous institutions of learning, including primary schools, secondary schools, teachers' training colleges, nursing schools, technical institutes and universities. One of the most prestigious chartered private universities in Kenya, Kenya Methodist University was the first to be established in the area in 2006. Two chartered public universities, Chuka University in Tharaka-Nithi County and Meru University of Science and Technology in Meru County, have been established. Other institutions of higher learning, including the University of Nairobi, Egerton University, Kenyatta University, Co-operative University College, Nazarene University and Mount Kenya University have established satellite campuses in the area, making Greater Meru a key education hub in Kenya

Economy
The Meru are primarily agrarian, growing a variety of crops and keeping livestock. Greater Meru is endowed with soils and climatic conditions that allow for the production of a variety of commodities including wheat, barley, potatoes, millet, sorghum and maize. High grade tea, coffee, bananas and miraa (khat) are the key cash crops. The Meru were the first Africans to grow coffee in Kenya, which they began in the early 1930s upon the implementation of the Devonshire White Paper of 1923. Other crops include groundnuts and a wide range of legumes, vegetables and fruits. The Meru also keep livestock, both for subsistence and commercial purposes. These include dairy and beef cattle, goats, sheep, poultry and honey bees. The Meru lands have huge potential for tourism by virtue of hosting the Meru and Mount Kenya national parks and the Lewa Conservancy. Mining activity is also expected to pick up once the ongoing exploratory works on the iron-ore deposits in Tharaka are completed.

Politics and alliances

The Meru wield a lot of political influence in Kenya, due to their astute and strategic political organization. No Meru has been president of Kenya. However, members of the community have always held some key and strategic positions in the government. In the early years of Kenya's independence, the Meru were in the Gikuyu, Embu, and Meru Association, a political mobilization outfit formed during the reign of Jomo Kenyatta. GEMA was formally banned in 1980, but since the advent of plural politics in Kenya in 1992, the Meru have largely voted with the Kikuyu and Embu in subsequent presidential elections.

In non-presidential elections, most constituencies in the Greater Meru vote for candidates based more on individual merit than on the basis of the sponsoring political party. This particularly manifested itself in the general elections of 2013, where the Orange Democratic Movement captured two seats, Igembe Central and Tigania East, in Meru County despite the predominance of the Jubilee Party in the larger region. The elections also saw the historic election of Rahim Dawood, a politician of Asian origin, to represent Imenti North Constituency and Kinoti Gatobu, a 26-year-old independent candidate, to represent Buuri Constituency. In the same elections, Kithure Kindiki, the Senator from Tharaka-Nithi County, became the Majority Leader in the Senate.

Meru Museum
The historical and cultural artifacts of the Meru are preserved at the Meru Museum, formerly the colonial office located in Meru Town. The Njuri Ncheke Shrine at Nchiru is also gazetted as a heritage site and placed under the care of the National Museums of Kenya. The Shrine is accessible and open to the public most time of the year unless there are Njuri Ncheke activities at the site. Members of the Njuri Ncheke, though bound by a strict oath of secrecy, can also provide valuable and authoritative information and insights into the Meru traditions and culture dating back to the yore and transmitted through generations.

Notable Meru

Political

 Kinoti Gatobu, MP
 Gitobu Imanyara, MP, journalist, civil rights advocate
 Mutea Iringo, ex Principal Secretary, Ministry of Interior and Coordination of National Government
 Anne Kananu, governor of Nairobi City County
 Kithure A. Kindiki, Senator of Tharaka Nithi and Leader of Majority in the senate
 Martha Koome, Chief Justice of Kenya
 Bernard Mate, former Legco Representative for Central Province - Kenya
 Peter Munya, Cabinet Secretary, former governor of Meru.
 Kiraitu Murungi, governor of Meru County and MP
 Francis Muthaura, former Head of civil service Kenya
 David Mwiraria, former Finance Minister
 Kilemi Mwiria,  educationalist and former Education assistant minister.
 Muthomi Njuki, governor of Tharaka Nithi County

Military

 Musa Mwariama, leader of the Mau Mau

Academia & research

 Jacob Kaimenyi, Cabinet Secretary for Lands - Kenya
 Margaret Kobia, Cabinet Secretary for Public Service - Kenya
 Leah Marangu, Vice Chancellor, African Nazarene University

Judiciary & law

Martha Karambu Koome, Chief Justice of the Republic of Kenya
Aaron Ringera, former Director Kenya Anti Corruption Commission (KACC)

Business & corporate

 Edward H. Ntalami, businessperson

Religious

 Samuel Kobia, former General Secretary, World Council of Churches (WCC)

Entertainment & arts

 Pierra Makena, DJ, actress 
 Nick Mutuma, actor, radio presenter

Notes

 Fadiman, Jeffrey A. (1993) When We Began, There Were Witchmen: An Oral History from Mount Kenya. Berkeley:  University of California Press.
 Mauta, Thuranira. (2010). Retracing The Footsteps of Ameru and Their sub-tribal differences. Nkubitu Publishing Co. Mwenemeru Kinyua

External links
History of the Meru 
History and culture of the Meru